Francis Safford Dodge (September 11, 1842 – February 19, 1908) was a US Army officer with the rank of Brigadier General, who received the Medal of Honor for his actions during the Indian Wars. He also served as Paymaster General.

Biography
Dodge was born in Danvers, Massachusetts and joined the 23rd Massachusetts Infantry in October 1861, and reached the rank of corporal by late 1863. In December 1863, he was commissioned as a first lieutenant in the 2nd USCT Cavalry Regiment. In July 1865, he was promoted to captain.

After the Civil War, Dodge was transferred to the 9th Cavalry Regiment as a first lieutenant. He regained his wartime rank in July 1867, and served in the White River War. He was promoted to major in 1880, and served as an army paymaster in Cuba during the Spanish–American War. He eventually became Paymaster General of the United States Army in January 1904 and was promoted to the rank of Brigadier General. Dodge retired in September 1906.

During the two years following his retirement, he served as Director of the American Surety and Trust Company. Dodge died in Washington D.C., and was buried in Arlington National Cemetery.

General Dodge was a companion of the New York Commandery of the Military Order of the Loyal Legion of the United States.

Medal of Honor citation
Rank and organization: Captain, Company D, 9th U.S. Cavalry. Place and date: Near White River Agency, Colo., September 29, 1879. Entered service at: Danvers, Mass. Birth: September 11, 1842, Danvers, Mass. Date of issue: April 2, 1898.

With a force of 40 men rode all night to the relief of a command that had been defeated and was besieged by an overwhelming force of Indians, reached the field at daylight, joined in the action and fought for 3 days.

References

External links
 Historical Register and Dictionary of the US Army

United States Army generals
Union Army officers
United States Army paymasters
American military personnel of the Indian Wars
American military personnel of the Spanish–American War
United States Army Medal of Honor recipients
American Indian Wars recipients of the Medal of Honor
Burials at Arlington National Cemetery
Paymaster-General of the United States Army
1842 births
1908 deaths